Due to variances in divorce law around the United Kingdom, the topic is broken down into multiple articles which are cataloged below:

Divorce in England and Wales
Divorce in Scotland
Divorce in Northern Ireland